Kägi Söhne AG (from German, lit. "Kägi Sons") is a Swiss confectioner and chocolate producer based in Lichtensteig (St. Gallen).

History 
The company was founded in 1934 as a bakery by Otto Kägi, who started producing wafers in 1942.  

The start of waffle production in the 1940s resulted in the gradual expansion of the company and the switch from manual to machine operation.  

In 1950, Kägi acquired a larger factory building to meet growing demand. The following year, Kägi became an open trading company, with the three Kägi sons Otto junior, Eugen and Alfred at the helm. In 1952, Kägi started coating his wafers with chocolate. Production has taken place since 1954 in a new building in Lichtensteig at the current location. In 1956, wafers were exported abroad for the first time. Since 1958, the year the product Kägi fret was launched, a significant part of the turnover has been attributable to exports.  

In 1960, he started his own production of chocolate from raw cocoa beans. After his death in 1965, the sons of Otto Kägi took over the company.  

In 1950 the number of employees was ten, in 1960 there were 120 (excluding seasonal workers). As of 2021, the company has 140 employees. The company is located in the Toggenburg region, where is found the Churfirsten range, used as the corporate logo.

Products 

The main speciality of Kägi Söhne is the Kägi fret (using the shortened French word for wafer: "gaufrette"), a twin chocolate coated wafer bar, wrapped in aluminium foil. It has been produced since 1958 (in its current form) and is today one of the most iconic chocolate bars produced in Switzerland. The Kägi Toggenburger, which are fresh butter biscuits, are the other speciality of the company.

See also 

 List of bean-to-bar chocolate manufacturers

References

External links

Official website

Companies established in 1934
Swiss chocolate companies
Swiss brands
Brand name chocolate
Food and drink companies established in 1934
Canton of St. Gallen
Biscuit brands